Gen. John G. Weaver House is a historic home located at Utica in Oneida County, New York. It was built about 1815 and is a massive 2-story, brick, hip roofed double pile building in the Federal style.  It is composed of a 2-story, five-by-four-bay rectangular main block, with a 2-story, gable-roofed rear wing.  It is believed that the home was designed by Philip Hooker or someone strongly influenced by his work.

It was listed on the National Register of Historic Places in 1989.

References

Buildings and structures in Utica, New York
Houses on the National Register of Historic Places in New York (state)
Federal architecture in New York (state)
Houses completed in 1815
Houses in Oneida County, New York
National Register of Historic Places in Oneida County, New York